The men's 400 metres was an event at the 1992 Summer Olympics in Barcelona, Spain. There were a total number of 68 participating athletes from 52 nations, with nine qualifying heats. The maximum number of athletes per nation had been set at 3 since the 1930 Olympic Congress. The event was won by Quincy Watts of the United States, the third in what would ultimately be seven consecutive American victories stretching from 1984 to 2008 and the 15th overall title in the event by the United States. Steve Lewis became the third man (and first American) to win a second medal in the event. Samson Kitur earned Kenya's first medal in the men's 400 metres since 1972.

Derek Redmond pulled his hamstring 150 meters into the first semi-final; despite his father escorting him to the finish line, Redmond was ruled as not finishing. Despite this ruling, the crowd gave him a standing ovation.

In the second semifinal, Quincy Watts ran the second fastest time in history, 43.71,  to break the Olympic record. At the Olympic trials, Danny Everett had run the previous second fastest time in history 43.81, while world record holder Butch Reynolds did not qualify; in the second semifinal, Everett suffered a foot injury and hobbled the last 100m to finish a distant last.

In the final, Watts again set the second fastest time in history and an Olympic Record and winning with his 43.50.

Background

This was the 22nd appearance of the event, which is one of 12 athletics events to have been held at every Summer Olympics. Defending gold medalist Steve Lewis and bronze medalist Danny Everett of the United States, but Quincy Watts beat silver medalist Butch Reynolds at the U.S. Olympic trials to take the third spot. Roger Black of Great Britain had taken silver at the 1991 world championship.

Angola, the Central African Republic, Costa Rica, Grenada, Lesotho, Mauritania, and Qatar appeared in this event for the first time. The Unified Team, consisting of some former Soviet republics, competed in the only Summer Games the Unified Team existed. One Yugoslav athlete competed as an "Independent Olympic Participant." The United States made its 21st appearance, most of any nation, having missed only the boycotted 1980 Games.

Competition format

The competition retained the basic four-round format from 1920. The "fastest loser" system, introduced in 1964, was used for the first round. There were 9 first-round heats, each with 7 or 8 runners. The top three runners in each heat advanced, along with the next five fastest overall. The 32 quarterfinalists were divided into 4 quarterfinals with 8 runners each; the top four athletes in each quarterfinal heat advanced to the semifinals, with no "fastest loser" spots. The semifinals featured 2 heats of 8 runners each. The top four runners in each semifinal heat advanced, making an eight-man final.

Records

These were the standing world and Olympic records (in seconds) prior to the 1976 Summer Olympics.

Quincy Watts set two new Olympic records. He first ran 43.71 in the semifinals and improved his mark in the final to 43.50.

The following national records were established during the competition:

Schedule

Following the 1984 schedule, the event was held on four separate days, with each round being on a different day.

All times are Central European Summer Time (UTC+2)

Results

Round 1

Heat 1

Heat 2

Heat 3

Heat 4

Heat 5

Heat 6

Heat 7

Heat 8

Heat 9

Quarterfinals

Quarterfinal 1

Quarterfinal 2

Quarterfinal 3

Quarterfinal 4

Semifinals

Semifinal 1

Redmond was injured and did not finish without assistance.

Semifinal 2

Final

The final was held on August 5, 1992.

See also
 1988 Men's Olympic Games 400 metres (Seoul)
 1990 Men's European Championships 400 metres (Split)
 1991 Men's World Championships 400 metres (Tokyo)
 1993 Men's World Championships 400 metres (Stuttgart)
 1994 Men's European Championships 400 metres (Helsinki)
 1995 Men's World Championships 400 metres (Gothenburg)
 1996 Men's Olympic Games 400 metres (Atlanta)

References

External links
 Official Report
 Results

 
400 metres at the Olympics
Men's events at the 1992 Summer Olympics